El Harino is a corregimiento in La Pintada District, Coclé Province, Panama. Its population as of 1990 was 6,520; its population as of 2000 was 6,990.

References

Corregimientos of Coclé Province